Oxybutynin, sold as under the brand names Ditropan among others, is a medication used to treat overactive bladder. It works similar to tolterodine, Darifenacin, and Solifenacin. While used for bed wetting in children, evidence to support this use is poor. It is taken by mouth or applied to the skin.

Common side effects include dry mouth, constipation, dizziness, trouble sleeping, and urinary tract infections. Serious side effects may include urinary retention and an increased risk of heat stroke. Use in pregnancy appears safe but has not been well studied while use in breastfeeding is of unclear safety. It is an antimuscarinic and works by blocking the effects of acetylcholine on smooth muscle.

Oxybutynin was approved for medical use in the United States in 1975. It is available as a generic medication.  In 2020, it was the 97th most commonly prescribed medication in the United States, with more than 7million prescriptions.

Medical use
The immediate and slow release versions work equally.

In people with overactive bladder, transdermal oxybutynin decreased the number of incontinence episodes and increased average voided volume. There was no difference between transdermal oxybutynin and extended-release oral tolterodine.

Tentative evidence supports the use of oxybutynin in hyperhidrosis (excessive sweating).

Adverse effects 
Common adverse effects that are associated with oxybutynin and other anticholinergics include: dry mouth, difficulty in urination, constipation, blurred vision, drowsiness, and dizziness. Anticholinergics have also been known to induce delirium.

Oxybutynin's tendency to reduce sweating can be dangerous. Reduced sweating increases the risk of heat exhaustion and heat stroke in apparently safe situations where normal sweating keeps others safe and comfortable. Adverse effects of elevated body temperature are more likely for the elderly and for those with health issues, especially multiple sclerosis.

N-Desethyloxybutynin is an active metabolite of oxybutynin that is thought responsible for much of the adverse effects associated with the use of oxybutynin. N-Desethyloxybutynin plasma levels may reach as much as six times that of the parent drug after administration of the immediate-release oral formulation. Alternative dosage forms have been developed in an effort to reduce blood levels of N-desethyloxybutynin and achieve a steadier concentration of oxybutynin than is possible with the immediate release form. The long-acting formulations also allow once-daily administration instead of the twice-daily dosage required with the immediate-release form. The transdermal patch, in addition to the benefits of the extended-release oral formulations, bypasses the first-pass hepatic effect that the oral formulations are subject to.  In those with overflow incontinence because of diabetes or neurological diseases like multiple sclerosis or spinal cord trauma, oxybutynin can worsen overflow incontinence since the fundamental problem is that the bladder is not contracting.

A large study linked the development of dementia in those over 65 to the use of oxybutynin, due to its anticholinergic properties.

Contraindications 
Oxybutynin chloride is contraindicated in patients with untreated narrow angle glaucoma, and in patients with untreated narrow anterior chamber angles—since anticholinergic drugs may aggravate these conditions. It is also contraindicated in partial or complete obstruction of the gastrointestinal tract, hiatal hernia, gastroesophageal reflux disease, paralytic ileus, intestinal atony of the elderly or debilitated patient, megacolon, toxic megacolon complicating ulcerative colitis, severe colitis, and myasthenia gravis. It is contraindicated in patients with obstructive uropathy and in patients with unstable cardiovascular status in acute hemorrhage. Oxybutynin chloride is contraindicated in patients who have demonstrated hypersensitivity to the product.

Pharmacology 
Oxybutynin chloride exerts direct antispasmodic effect on smooth muscle and inhibits the muscarinic action of acetylcholine on smooth muscle. It exhibits one-fifth of the anticholinergic activity of atropine on the rabbit detrusor muscle, but four to ten times the antispasmodic activity. No blocking effects occur at skeletal neuromuscular junctions or autonomic ganglia (antinicotinic effects).

Sources say the drug is absorbed within one hour and has an elimination half-life of 2 to 5 hours. There is a wide variation among individuals in the drug's concentration in blood. This, and its low concentration in urine, suggest that it is eliminated through the liver.

Chemistry 
Oxybutynin contains one stereocenter. Commercial formulations are sold as the racemate. The (R)-enantiomer is a more potent anticholinergic than either the racemate or the (S)-enantiomer, which is essentially without anticholinergic activity at doses used in clinical practice. However, (R)-oxybutynin administered alone offers little or no clinical benefit above and beyond the racemic mixture. The other actions (calcium antagonism, local anesthesia) of oxybutynin are not stereospecific. (S)-Oxybutynin has not been clinically tested for its spasmolytic effects, but may be clinically useful for the same indications as the racemate, without the unpleasant anticholinergic side effects.

Brand names
Oxybutynin is available by mouth in generic formulation and under the brand names Ditropan, Lyrinel XL, Ditrospam, Kentera, and Aquiette, as a transdermal patch under the brand name Oxytrol, and as a topical gel under the brand name Gelnique.

See also 
Arecoline

References

External links 
 

Tertiary alcohols
Alkyne derivatives
Diethylamino compounds
AbbVie brands
Johnson & Johnson brands
Carboxylate esters
Muscarinic antagonists
Wikipedia medicine articles ready to translate
Cyclohexyl compounds